HMS Scylla (F71) was a  of the Royal Navy (RN). She was built at Devonport Royal Dockyard, the last RN frigate to be built there as of 2016. Scylla was commissioned in 1970, taken out of service in 1993 in accordance with Options for Change, and sunk as an artificial reef in 2004 off Whitsand Bay, Cornwall.

Construction and career
In early 1966, the British Admiralty ordered Scylla, a "Broad-Beam" Leander-class frigate, from Devonport Dockyard, at a cost of £6,600,000. Scylla was laid down on 17 May 1967, launched on 8 August 1968 and commissioned on 14 February 1970, receiving the pennant number F71.

1970s

On 22 January 1973, Scylla collided with the Torpoint ferry, one of three separate collisions involving four warships on the same day. Scyllas collision had occurred while on sea trials following a refit. While Scylla resumed her journey, the ferry sustained a  gash at the bow. A court martial in May reprimanded Scyllas commanding officer, Captain Peter Sutton. In May, Scylla was deployed with other frigates to support the Royal Navy's operations against Iceland during the Second Cod War. The frigate conducted patrols to counter Icelandic coast guard ships targeting fishing vessels. On 1 June, the Icelandic gunboat Aegir collided with Scylla, the first such incident to occur during the fishing dispute.

Fishing relations with Iceland deteriorated further in 1975, and the dispute escalated into the Third Cod War. From February 1976, Scylla began operating in support of British fishing trawlers. In May, Scylla provided the escort to the royal yacht  during Queen Elizabeth II's state visit to Finland. Scylla attended the Spithead Fleet Review, held in honour of Queen Elizabeth II's Silver Jubilee.

1980s
In 1980, Scylla provided support when Cayman Brac, part of the Cayman Islands, was struck by a powerful hurricane. Scylla went into refit in 1980, to provision the frigate with Type 2016 sonar, Exocet and Sea Wolf missile launchers, and a Westland Lynx helicopter. The refit lasted four years, and cost £79,692,000, rendering the frigate unavailable for service in the Falklands. After being recommissioned, Scylla acted as guard ship for the West Indies and patrolled the Persian Gulf as part of Armilla Patrol.. In November 1986 at the end of her first Armilla Patrol, she was the escort to Britannia during the Prince and Princess of Wales' visit to the Middle East firing a Royal Salute off Matrah, Oman and also visiting Jiddah. The Princess of Wales flew home from Hurghada and Syclla then escorted Britannia north through the Suez Canal and on to Akrotiri, Cyprus where Prince Charles disembarked. While on Armilla Patrol in late December 1987, Scylla and  twice intervened after two ships, the Korean Hyundai No 7 and British Eastern Power, were targeted by Iranian gunships. After the Korean vessel had been attacked south of Abu Musa Island, Scyllas crew launched the frigate's Westland Lynx helicopter and evacuated some of the ship's crew.

1990s
In 1990, Scylla underwent a 10-month refit at Rosyth. By 1993, Scylla had become the last representative of her class in active service. The frigate's last deployment came that year when she deployed to the South Atlantic. By then she was showing her age, and it had become difficult for the ship's engineers to maintain. Scylla suffered steering problems while on patrol and collided with the accompanying tanker . While Scylla suffered only superficial damage, Gold Rover had to have repairs for hull damage. Scylla was decommissioned in December 1993. In 1992, Scylla, with the commanding officer, officers and members of the ship's company in attendance, was granted the Freedom of the City of Aberdeen.

Sinking and use as a dive site

The ship was bought by the National Marine Aquarium for £200,000 and on 27 March 2004 Scylla was sunk off Whitsand Bay, Cornwall, to form the first such artificial reef in Europe.

Within three months of sinking the wreck was colonised by sea anemone, mussels and scallops and by six months sea urchin and starfish were found in large numbers. By 2021, 250 species have been recorded.

In 2007 two amateur divers were killed after entering the wreck. Two more experienced divers died inside the engine room on deck three in September 2021. There are fears that the continuing deposition close to the wreck of dredged waste from the Tamar estuary has led to large quantities of silt spreading through the ship and frequently mixing with the moving water reducing visibility, thereby preventing divers from finding their way out before their air supply diminishes. Following a 2014 survey the National Marine Aquarium who manage the site advised divers not to enter the wreck and solely to undertake scenic dives.

References

Publications
 
 Marriott, Leo, 1983.  Royal Navy Frigates 1945-1983, Ian Allan Ltd.  
 
 Roberts, John (2009), Safeguarding the Nation: The Story of the Modern Royal Navy, Seaforth Publishing. 

 

1968 ships
1973 in England
Cornish shipwrecks
Leander-class frigates
Maritime incidents in 1973
Ships built in Plymouth, Devon
Ships of the Fishery Protection Squadron of the United Kingdom
Ships sunk as artificial reefs
Ships sunk as dive sites
Shipwrecks in the English Channel
Wreck diving sites in England